The Krahn people is an ethnic group of Liberia and Ivory Coast.

Krahn may also refer to
 Krahn language (disambiguation), several related languages spoken by the Krahn people
 Annike Krahn (born 1985), German footballer
 Betina Krahn (active from 1983), American writer of historical romance novels
 Brent Krahn (born 1982), Canadian former professional ice hockey goaltender
 Edgar Krahn (1894-1961), Estonian mathematician
 Fernando Krahn (1935-2010), Chilean cartoonist and plastic artist
 Johannes Krahn (1908-1974), German architect and academic teacher
 Maria Krahn (1896–1977), German actress

See also
 Rayleigh–Faber–Krahn inequality, in spectral geometry
 Kraan (disambiguation)
 Kran (disambiguation)
 

Russian Mennonite surnames